The Samsung Galaxy S22 is a series of Android-based smartphones designed, developed, manufactured, and marketed by Samsung Electronics as part of its Galaxy S series. Unveiled at Samsung's Galaxy Unpacked event on 9 February 2022.

They collectively serve as the successor to the Samsung Galaxy S21 series. The first three smartphones were unveiled at Samsung's Galaxy Unpacked event on 9 February 2022.

The S22 series consists of the base Galaxy S22 model, the plus Galaxy S22+ model, and the camera-note-focused Galaxy S22 Ultra model. The S22 Ultra serves as the official successor to the Samsung Galaxy Note20 series and Note lineup, housing an integrated S-pen. There are numerous upgrades the phones possess over the previous models, in addition to improved specifications, an enhanced camera system supporting 8K video recording (7680×4320) at 24 frames per second, and a super-resolution zoom of 30–100x, for the Ultra model.

The three phones were released in the United States and Europe on 25 February 2022. The Galaxy S22, S22+, and S22 Ultra launch with prices at $799.99, $999.99, and $1199.99, respectively.

It was succeeded by the Samsung Galaxy S23.

History 
The Samsung Galaxy S22 series was unveiled on the 8th February 2022 as the successor of the Galaxy S21 series. All devices' design schemes are identical to the 2021 models, with the exception of the S22 Ultra, retaining the individual camera modules excluding the camera bump and rectangular body. The base model maintains a glass back instead of the (plastic) polycarbonate back the S21 originally had. The S22 and S22+ contain comparable software, composition, and hardware to last year's models, with minor distinctions. The S22 Ultra underwent massive reconstruction, with the phone serving as the successor to the discontinued Galaxy Note series. The device features a rectangular body, higher resolution display, and advanced camera system, and most notably, the Ultra model houses an embedded S-pen, a signature feature of the Note series. The S22 Ultra serves as the high-end professional model of the lineup and successor to the S21 Ultra, while the base models succeed the S21 and S21+, respectively.

Lineup 
The S22 line consists of three devices. The Galaxy S22 is the least expensive with a  screen. The Galaxy S22+ has similar hardware in a larger form factor, with a  screen, faster charging and a larger battery capacity. The Galaxy S22 Ultra has a  screen and the largest battery capacity in the lineup, with a more advanced camera setup and a higher resolution display compared to the S22 and S22+, as well as an embedded S Pen – the first in the S Series as a whole.

Design 
The Galaxy S22 series has a design similar to preceding S series phones, with an Infinity-O display containing a circular cutout in the top center for the front selfie camera. All three models use Gorilla Glass Victus+ for the back panel, unlike the S21 series which had plastic on the smaller S21. The rear camera array on the S22 and S22+ has a metallic surround, while the S22 Ultra has a separate lens protrusion for each camera element.

Specifications

Hardware

Chipsets 
The S22 line comprises three models with various hardware specifications. Except for some African and all European countries that utilize the Exynos 2200, all models outside these regions utilize the Qualcomm Snapdragon 8 Gen 1.

Display 
The S22 series feature "Dynamic AMOLED 2X" displays with HDR10+ support and "dynamic tone mapping" technology. All models utilize a second-generation ultrasonic in-screen fingerprint sensor.

Storage 

The S22 and S22+ offer 8 GB of RAM with 128 GB and 256 GB options for internal storage. The S22 Ultra has 8 GB of RAM with 128 GB as well as a 12 GB option with 256 GB, 512 GB and 1 TB options for internal storage. Unlike the S21 Ultra, the S22 Ultra doesn't feature a model with a 16 GB RAM variant. All three models lack a microSD card slot.

Batteries 
The S22, S22+, and S22 Ultra contain non-removable 3,700 mAh, 4,500 mAh, and 5000 mAh Li-Po batteries respectively. The S22 supports wired charging over USB-C at up to 25W (using USB Power Delivery) while the S22+ and S22 Ultra have faster 45W charging. Tests found there's no significant difference between the 45W and 25W charging speeds. All three have Qi inductive charging up to 15W. The phones also have the ability to charge other Qi-compatible devices from the S22's own battery power, which is branded as "Wireless PowerShare," at up to 4.5W.

Connectivity 
All three phones support 5G SA/NSA networks. The Galaxy S22 supports Wi-Fi 6 and Bluetooth 5.2, while the Galaxy S22+ and S22 Ultra support Wi-Fi 6E and Bluetooth 5.2. The S22+ and S22 Ultra models also support Ultra Wideband (UWB) for short-range communications similar to Bluetooth (not to be confused with 5G mmWave, which is marketed as Ultra Wideband by Verizon). Samsung uses this technology for their new "SmartThings Find" feature and the Samsung Galaxy SmartTag+.

Cameras 

The S22 and S22+ have a 50 MP wide sensor, a 10 MP telephoto sensor with 3x optical zoom, and a 12 MP ultrawide sensor. The S22 Ultra retains its predecessor's 108 MP sensor with 12-bit HDR. It also has two 10 MP telephoto sensors with 3x and 10x optical zoom as well as a 12 MP ultrawide sensor. The front-facing camera uses a 10 MP sensor on the S22 and S22+, and a 40 MP sensor on the S22 Ultra.

The Galaxy S22 series can record HDR10+ video and support HEIF.

Supported video modes 
The Samsung Galaxy S22 series supports the following video modes:
 8K@24fps
 4K@30/60fps
 1080p@30/60/240fps
 720p@960fps (480fps is interpolated to 960fps on the S22 Ultra)

Still frames extracted from high resolution footage can act as standalone photographs.

S Pen 
The S22 Ultra is the first S series phone to include a built-in S Pen, a hallmark feature of the Galaxy Note series. The S Pen has latency at 2.8ms, reduced from 26ms on Note 20 and 9ms on the Note 20 Ultra and S21 Ultra (note that the S21 Ultra had S Pen functionality, but it was not included with the phone), and marked the introduction of an 'AI-based co-ordination prediction system'. The S Pen also supports Air gestures and the Air Action system.

Software 
The S22 phones were released with Android 12 (One UI 4.1) with Samsung's One UI software. Samsung Knox is included for enhanced device security, and a separate version exists for enterprise use. One UI 5.0 was released on 17 October 2022.

Reception

Performance throttling controversy 
Testing performed by benchmarking utility Geekbench and media outlet Android Police reported that Samsung's Game Optimizing Service (GOS) would throttle the performance of the device significantly in a number of popular apps while excluding benchmarking utilities; one specific test, using a copy of Geekbench 5 that was modified to look like Genshin Impact to the GOS, recorded a loss of 45% in single-core performance and 28% in multi-core performance versus an undisguised copy of the utility on the S22+. In response, Geekbench has permanently delisted the entire S22, S21 and S10 lineup from its service.
Samsung has since released an update allowing S22 users to disable GOS on their devices.

Gallery

References

External links 
 Galaxy S22 5G – Official website
 Galaxy S22 Ultra 5G – Official website (S22 Ultra)
 Galaxy S22 User Manual – Download user manual for Samsung Galaxy S22 5G series

Android (operating system) devices
Samsung Galaxy
Flagship smartphones
Samsung smartphones
Mobile phones introduced in 2022
Mobile phones with multiple rear cameras
Mobile phones with 8K video recording
Mobile phones with stylus